Last Christmas is a 2019 romantic comedy film directed by Paul Feig and written by Bryony Kimmings and Emma Thompson, who co-wrote the story with her husband, Greg Wise. Named after the 1984 song of the same name and inspired by the music of George Michael and Wham!, the film stars Emilia Clarke as a disillusioned Christmas store worker who forms a relationship with a mysterious man (Henry Golding) and begins to fall for him; Thompson and Michelle Yeoh also star.

Last Christmas was theatrically released in the United States on 8 November 2019 and in the United Kingdom on 15 November 2019 by Universal Pictures. It received mixed reviews from critics, who praised the performances and chemistry of Clarke and Golding, but criticised the screenplay and story. The film grossed $123 million worldwide.

Plot
Katarina "Kate" Andrich, a young aspiring singer, bounces around between her friends’ places, and has a dead-end job as an elf at a year-round Christmas shop in Central London, whose strict but good-hearted Chinese owner calls herself "Santa". Whilst at work, she notices a man outside staring upward and strikes up a conversation, learning that his name is Tom Webster and his oft-repeated life wisdom is to "look up" for things that others seldom observe.

After an unsuccessful singing audition, Kate sees Tom again and they go for a walk, where he charms her with his unusual observations of London. Upon being evicted by her oldest friend, Kate is forced to return home to her parents, both Yugoslavian immigrants. Her mother Petra suffers from depression, and her father Ivan, a former lawyer, works as a minicab driver as he cannot afford to retrain to practise law in the United Kingdom. Kate feels suffocated by her mother, who dotes on her while neglecting Kate's older sister, Marta, a successful lawyer who is a lesbian but hides her sexual orientation from their parents.

Kate begins spending more time with Tom, who makes deliveries on a bike and volunteers at a homeless shelter, which she initially mocks. Looking for Tom, who often disappears for days at a time and says he keeps his phone in a cupboard, she begins helping at the shelter in the hope of running into him, but finds that the staff have never met him.

While celebrating Marta's promotion, Kate spitefully outs Marta as a lesbian to their parents. Storming out, she then runs into Tom, who takes her back to his apartment. Kate reveals that, a year earlier, she was seriously ill and had to have a heart transplant. Kate says that she feels half-dead and questions whether she has the talent to make it as a performer. After opening up to Tom, Kate tries to initiate sex, but he declines.

After spending the night with Tom, Kate begins taking small steps to improve her life; taking care of her body, setting up Santa with a Danish man who loves Christmas as much as she does, apologising to Marta and her girlfriend, and singing Christmas songs to busk for money for the shelter. After a few days she runs into Tom again, who says he has something important to tell her, but she preemptively asserts he is fearful of commitment and walks away.

Kate continues to try to do good in her daily life. Finally, wanting to make amends with Tom, she returns to his apartment only to meet an estate agent who is holding viewings, who explains that the place has been vacant during the probate process. After some initial confusion, he reveals that the previous owner was killed in a bicycle accident last Christmas, and Kate realises that Tom was the organ donor whose heart she received. Going to a small garden, which was Tom's favourite place, Kate encounters him again (realising he is a ghost) where he says his heart "was always going to be yours" and asks her in parting to look after it. The bench on which they sat during their first trip to the garden is revealed to be a memorial bench for Tom.

On Christmas Eve, Kate organises a show utilising the talents of the people at the shelter and invites all of her friends and family, including the newly together Santa and her Danish admirer, and the estate agent she met at Tom’s apartment. Kate delicately performs a solo of the Wham! song, "Last Christmas", intertwined with flashbacks of her time with Tom, and revelry ensues when the curtain rises and she is joined by the band of shelter performers. The next day, Kate and her family celebrate Christmas together, joined by Marta's girlfriend Alba for the first time.

The Christmas celebration transitions to summer, where a visibly healthier Kate is seen writing in her diary on Tom’s memorial bench in the garden to which he introduced her. Smiling and happy, Kate looks up, as Tom always advised.

Cast

In addition, Andrew Ridgeley, from the duo Wham!, whose song "Last Christmas" is instrumental to the plot, has an uncredited cameo appearance in the audience at the end of the film.

Production
In September 2018, it was reported that Emilia Clarke and Henry Golding would star in a London-set romantic comedy taking place at Christmas, titled Last Christmas. Paul Feig was set to direct, with Emma Thompson co-writing the screenplay. In October, it was announced that Thompson would star as well, and that the film would feature the music of the late singer George Michael (who died in 2016), including "Last Christmas", and previously unreleased tracks. In November 2018, Michelle Yeoh joined the cast of the film. In November 2021, it was revealed that Harry Styles had been approached for the role of Tom, but declined it stating that he felt he was "too young to take the role".

Last Christmas was filmed from 26 November 2018 to February 2019. Filming locations included Piccadilly Circus, the Strand, Regent Street, the Thames Embankment, Covent Garden (where the Christmas shop is located), West London Film Studios, St Mary's Bryanston Square Church, Marylebone and the Phoenix Garden. 
On 31 October 2019, Thompson and Wise published a collection of personal essays about the meaning of Christmas in a book also called Last Christmas. Contributors include Andy Serkis, Caitlin Moran, Olivia Colman and Emily Watson. The profits from the book went to two charities, Crisis and The Refugee Council.

Music

The musical score was composed by Theodore Shapiro. Back Lot Music has released the film score.

An official soundtrack album was released by Legacy Recordings on CD, two-disc vinyl, and digital formats on 8 November 2019. The album contains 14 Wham! and solo George Michael songs, as well as a previously unreleased song originally completed in 2015 titled "This Is How (We Want You to Get High)". The soundtrack album debuted at number one on the UK Official Soundtrack Albums Chart and at number 11 on the UK Albums Chart on 15 November 2019. It also entered the Australian Albums Chart at number seven, and peaked at number 26 on both the Irish Albums Chart and US Billboard 200.

Release
In the United States, the film was due for release on 15 November 2019, but was moved up a week to 8 November. It was released on 15 November 2019 in the United Kingdom.

Home media
Last Christmas was released on Digital HD from Amazon Video and iTunes on 21 January 2020, and on DVD and Blu-ray on 4 February 2020.

Reception

Box office
Last Christmas grossed $35.2 million in the United States and Canada, and $86.4 million in other territories, for a worldwide total of $121.6 million.

In the United States and Canada, Last Christmas was released alongside Doctor Sleep, Midway, and Playing with Fire, and was projected to gross $13–19 million from 3,448 theatres in its opening weekend. It made $4.1 million on its first day, including $575,000 from Thursday night previews. It went on to debut to $11.6 million, finishing fourth, behind its fellow newcomers. In its second weekend, the film grossed $6.7 million, finishing fifth. The film took in $3 million during its third weekend, finishing ninth and losing 1,043 theaters.

In the United Kingdom it debuted to £2.7 million, from 612 cinemas, finishing first.

Critical response
The website's critics consensus reads, "Likable leads, terrific behind-the-scenes talent, and an intriguing musical hook aren't enough to save Last Christmas from its poorly conceived story." On Metacritic, the film has a weighted average score of 50 out of 100, based on 40 critics, indicating "mixed or average reviews". Audiences polled by CinemaScore gave the film an average grade of "B−" on an A+ to F scale, while those at PostTrak gave it an average 3 out of 5 stars.

Owen Gleiberman of Variety gave the film a negative review and wrote, "It's twee, it's precious, it's forced. And it's light on true romance, maybe because the movie itself is a little too in love with itself." John DeFore of The Hollywood Reporter called it a misfire, however adding, "it earns some warm feelings for its determination not to be like anything else currently in circulation." Alonso Duralde of TheWrap compared the film to a Christmas album, and said it was not as good as Paul Feig's best work, though "it fulfills a craving for sticky Christmas pudding." Hadley Freeman in The Guardian contrasted Emma Thompson's 1995 high quality adaptation of Sense and Sensibility to Last Christmas describing it as "second-rate, absurd, [and] inexplicable".

Charles Bramesco of The A.V. Club called the film "a guilty pleasure" but criticised the plot twist as predictable. He praised Clarke for her performance, saying "she succeeds in the only real meaningful test of rom-com skill, in that she makes us want her to be happy."

David Fear of Rolling Stone described the film as "incredibly, shockingly, monumentally bad. The kind of bad that falls somewhere between finding a lump of coal in your stocking and discovering one painfully lodged in your rectum."

See also
 List of Christmas films

References

External links

 
 
 

2019 films
2019 romantic comedy films
2010s American films
2010s British films
2010s Christmas comedy films
2010s English-language films
American Christmas comedy films
American ghost films
American fantasy comedy films
American romantic comedy films
American LGBT-related films
British Christmas comedy films
British ghost films
British fantasy films
British LGBT-related films
British romantic comedy films
Lesbian-related films
Films about homelessness
Films about mother–daughter relationships
Films about organ transplantation
Films based on songs
Films set in 1999
Films set in 2017
Films set in London
Films set in Yugoslavia
Films shot in London
Films directed by Paul Feig
Films produced by Paul Feig
Films scored by Theodore Shapiro
Films with screenplays by Emma Thompson
Perfect World Pictures films
Universal Pictures films